The Yamur Lake grunter or Jamur Lake grunter (Variichthys jamoerensis) is a species of freshwater ray-finned fish, a grunter in the family Terapontidae. It is endemic to Lake Yamur (alternatively spelled Jamur) on West Papua in Indonesia.

References

Yamur Lake grunter
Freshwater fish of Western New Guinea
Taxonomy articles created by Polbot
Fish described in 1971
Fish of Indonesia